Cobitis turcica is a species of ray-finned fish in the family Cobitidae.
It is found only in Turkey.
Its natural habitats are rivers, freshwater lakes, and freshwater marshes.
It is threatened by habitat loss.

References

Sources

Cobitis
Endemic fauna of Turkey
Fish described in 1925
Taxonomy articles created by Polbot